The Veasey-DeArmond House is a historic house on Arkansas Highway 81, south of Monticello, Arkansas, near Lacey.  It is one of the county's finest vernacular Greek Revival houses.  The single-story wood-frame house was built in the 1850s on land granted to Abner Veasey by President James Buchanan, and follows a roughly Georgian-style center hall plan with parlor.  The front entry is framed by sidelight windows, with a transom above, and pilasters flanking the windows.

The house was listed on the National Register of Historic Places in 1989.

See also
National Register of Historic Places listings in Drew County, Arkansas

References

Houses on the National Register of Historic Places in Arkansas
Houses completed in 1850
Houses in Drew County, Arkansas
National Register of Historic Places in Drew County, Arkansas